Lila Ibrahim is the Chief Operating Officer of DeepMind, co-founder and chair of Team4Tech, and a member of the UK AI Council. Her previous roles include Chief Operations Officer at Coursera, Senior Operating Partner at Kleiner Perkins Caufield & Byers, and Chief of Staff to Intel CEO and Chairman Craig Barrett.

Early life and education 
Ibrahim studied electrical and computer engineering at Purdue University, and remains on their board of advisors. She earned her bachelor's degree in 1993. She was a member of the sorority Phi Sigma Rho.

Career 
Ibrahim started her working life in 1993 at Intel, where she was as an engineer on the Pentium processor. During 18 years at Intel she held various technical, marketing, and leadership positions, including serving as Chief of Staff for Craig Barrett. Her work included leading the Digital Village initiative which delivered education and e-governance from the Amazon to Africa, leading Intel's Developer Forum, leading the Emerging Market group based in China developing the classmatePC business, and establishing DVD standards for PCs. In 2000, she took a two-month sabbatical to build a computer lab in the Lebanese orphanage her father grew up in. She took her experience back to Intel, where she built technology for K-12 education. Working on a national initiative with Portugal, she delivered 400,000 computers and trained 30,000 teachers in one year.

In 2007, Ibrahim was recognised by the World Economic Forum as a Young Global Leader. In 2009, she was featured on the cover of ForbesWoman for her role promoting women in technology. In 2010, she was awarded the Anita Borg Institute Women of Vision Award for Social Impact, and was appointed Purdue University's Outstanding Electrical & Computer Engineer.  She sat on the Global Council of Thunderbird School of Global Management. She was further recognised by the Aspen Institute as a Crown Fellow in 2011 and a Braddock Scholar in 2012. As part of her Aspen Institute fellowship, she worked with Julie Clugage to create Team4Tech, a program which partners volunteers with educational projects in the developing world.

Ibrahim was appointed Chief of Staff at Kleiner Perkins Caufield & Byers in 2010. Through Kleiner Perkins Caufield & Byers she began to work with Coursera. Ibrahim was made President of Coursera in 2013, later Chief Business and Operating Officer, and remained there until 2017. During this time she was appointed to the U.S. Secretary of Commerce's National Advisory Council on Innovation and Entrepreneurship. From 2015 to 2019, she was on the board of the American news corporation Gannett. She was a keynote speaker at the 2016 Pioneer Summit, and the 2017 South by Southwest conference in Austin.

In April 2018 Ibrahim was appointed Chief Operating Officer of DeepMind, where she is responsible for managing the company's growth. She continues to mentor young entrepreneurs. Ibrahim is an advocate for increasing women's representation in technology.

In 2019, Ibrahim was named to UK Business Insider's lists including Most Influential Leaders Shaping Business Tech (#13)  and the Most Interesting & Impactful Women in Tech (#5).

In 2021, she was appointed to the UK AI council.

Ibrahim is featured in the Notable Women in Computing cards.

References 

Chief operating officers
Purdue University College of Engineering alumni
Silicon Valley people
Living people
Intel people
American women computer scientists
American computer scientists
American people of Lebanese descent
American women business executives
20th-century American women scientists
20th-century American businesswomen
20th-century American businesspeople
21st-century American women scientists
21st-century American businesswomen
21st-century American businesspeople
Henry Crown Fellows
Year of birth missing (living people)